The list of known High Sheriffs of Surrey extends back to 1066. At various times the High Sheriff of Surrey was also High Sheriff of Sussex (1229–1231, 1232–1240, 1242–1567, 1571–1635).

1066–1228
(High Sheriffs of Surrey only)

1229–1398
(Sheriffs of Surrey and Sussex)

1399–1509
(High Sheriffs of Surrey and Sussex)

1509–1566
(High Sheriffs of Surrey and Sussex)

1566–1635

1636–1702
(High Sheriffs of Surrey only)

1702–1799

19th century

20th century

21st century

References

 
Surrey
Local government in Surrey
People from Surrey
History of Surrey
Surrey-related lists